Uzbuna! (trans. Alarm!) is the nineteenth studio album from Serbian rock band Riblja Čorba, released in 2012.

Recording and release
The album was recorded in Studio O in Belgrade, and produced by John McCoy, who produced the band's albums Mrtva priroda (1981), Buvlja pijaca (1982) and Istina (1985), and with whom the band cooperated again after 27 years. It was mastered in Abbey Road Studios by Peter Mew.

The album cover was designed by Jugoslav and Jakša Vlahović, and refers to the cover of the band's album Mrtva priroda. In an interview for Večernje novosti, the band's frontman Bora Đorđević stated that the "cyber version of the chicken from Mrtva priroda" symbolizes "fight against new technologies" which "devalue every art form".

The album was released on both compact disc and vinyl, being the band's first album released on vinyl after twenty years.

Track listing

Personnel
Bora Đorđević - vocals
Vidoja Božinović - guitar, backing vocals
Miša Aleksić - bass guitar, backing vocals
Vicko Milatović - drums, backing vocals
Nikola Zorić - keyboards, backing vocals, engineer

Additional personnel
John McCoy - producer, bass guitar (on track 5), backing vocals
Sava Ristić - harmonica (on track 10)
Gane Pecikoza - backing vocals
Goran Jović - backing vocals
Milan Popović - backing vocals
Miljko Radonjić - backing vocals
Slobodan Marković - backing vocals
Oliver Jovanović - engineer
Peter Mew - mastered by
Jugoslav Vlahović - cover art, photography
Jakša Vlahović - cover art, photography

References

External links
 

Riblja Čorba albums
2012 albums